All the Young Dudes is a fan fiction written by MsKingBean89 on Archive of Our Own (AO3) that is set in the Harry Potter universe.  It was written from March 2017 to November 2018.  The fan fiction is over 500,000 words long and contains 188 chapters.  The story takes its title from the David Bowie song, "All the Young Dudes".  It is set in the early 70s and follows Remus Lupin from before his first year at Hogwarts to summer 1995, around the beginning of the events of Harry Potter and the Order of the Phoenix.

Plot summary 
The story is told from the perspective of Harry Potter character Remus Lupin. Nearing his 5th birthday, Lupin was bitten by a werewolf, Fenrir Greyback, and became one himself. Soon after, his father died by suicide due to the knowledge of the pain and agony his son would endure, and his mother placed Lupin in St. Edmund's, a children's home for boys. At St. Edmund's, Lupin is looked after by Matron, who locks him up during the full moon to keep him from hurting any of the other boys, while simultaneously preserving his secret.

As Lupin comes of age, Albus Dumbledore visits the home to give Lupin his acceptance letter to Hogwarts and explain his special situation. Since he is a werewolf, he will go into a secret tunnel under the Whomping Willow on full moons which leads to the Shrieking Shack, where he can undergo his transformation in privacy and safety. While attending school, he befriends James Potter, Sirius Black and Peter Pettigrew; the four soon begin to call themselves the Marauders.

In the summer of 1975, Lupin realises that he is gay after having intimate relations with Grant Chapman, his new roommate at St. Edmunds. Upon returning to Hogwarts, he finds he has a crush on his friend and classmate, Sirius Black. Eventually, on his birthday, Lupin kisses Black. In sixth year, the two become an unofficial couple and Lupin helps Black discover his own sexuality. Lupin comes out to the rest of his friends on a camping trip, and later Black tells them that he and Lupin are a couple.

After his schooling, Remus helps in the war effort, trying to defeat the Dark Lord, Voldemort. A prophecy regarding Potter's newborn son compels them to go into hiding. Meanwhile, Lupin becomes an advocate for the werewolves on the side of evil and this leads to Black believing he is a traitor, causing turmoil between them. While Remus is staying with a wolf pack to enlist their help, Pettigrew, being the real spy, betrays Potter and his wife Lily Potter (née Evans) who are consequently killed. Black is subsequently framed for revealing their whereabouts.

With no way to cope with his friend's deaths and Black's seeming betrayal, Remus shuts himself off from the Wizarding World, finding comfort in his old friend, Chapman. The two become a couple and live in Lupin and Black's old apartment. After the events of Harry Potter and the Prisoner of Azkaban, where Black's innocence was revealed, Black returns to find Chapman and Lupin a couple. Chapman moves to Brighton for a new job after realising that Lupin is still in love with Black. Lupin and Black reconcile.

Release 
The story was published on Archive of Our Own (AO3) between March 2017 and November 2018. Other related works were released on AO3 by the author including short stories, unreleased chapters and an epilogue titled Out of the Blue.

Media reception 
All the Young Dudes has gained a generally positive reception. It gained popularity on TikTok in the end of 2020 and beginning of 2021. On TikTok, All the Young Dude's hashtag, #ATYD, has over 1.5 billion views. TikTokers often fancast the characters (choosing celebrities and actors which they believe look like the characters) alongside creating memes about the story. Popular fancasts include Andrew Garfield as Remus Lupin, Ben Barnes as Sirius Black and Aaron Taylor Johnson as James Potter.

The Mary Sue writer Benedetta Geddo noted that the story is "a beautifully written story of friends and war and happiness and loss". She highlighted the story's love story between Lupin and Black, noting that "the queer subtext has always been there" in the original Harry Potter novels, adding that their love story was written "realistically and beautiful, immersing it in its historical and cultural context and delivering on the high stakes the characters are living through". Slate posited that the reason the story is so "engrossing" is the extent to which it is "detailed and invested it is in building a world outside of the one Rowling created."

Notes

References 

Fiction set in the 1970s
Fiction set in the 1980s
Fiction set in the 1990s
Harry Potter fan fiction
Mental health in fiction
Witchcraft in written fiction
Wizards in fiction
Works of unknown authorship
Works of uncertain authorship
Romantic fiction